The Felder's tiger (Parantica phyle) is a species of nymphalid butterfly in the Danainae subfamily. It is endemic to the Philippines.

References

Parantica
Lepidoptera of the Philippines
Endemic fauna of the Philippines
Taxonomy articles created by Polbot
Butterflies described in 1863